Sao San Htun (30 May 1907 – 20 July 1947) was the hereditary chief of the Shan State of Mongpawn, and Minister of Hill Regions in Myanmar's pre-independence interim government. He was a signatory to the Panglong Agreement that was the basis for the formation of modern Myanmar. On 19 July 1947, Sao San Htun, along with Aung San and seven others, was shot by gunmen during a cabinet meeting at the Secretariat complex in downtown Yangon. He died the next day on 20 July at noon. The date of the assassination, 19 July, is commemorated each year as the Martyrs' Day in Myanmar.

References

Assassinated Burmese politicians
1907 births
1947 deaths
People from Shan State
Government ministers of Myanmar
People murdered in Myanmar
Deaths by firearm in Myanmar
Burmese people of Shan descent
Burmese people of World War II